</noinclude>

Tam Điệp is a city of Ninh Bình Province in the Red River Delta region of Vietnam. It was established on 11 May 2015. As of 2015 the city had a population of 104,175. The city covers an area of 105 km².

References

Districts of Ninh Bình province
Cities in Vietnam